Esthero (born Jenny-Bea Englishman on December 23, 1978 in Stratford, Ontario) is a Canadian singer-songwriter who lives in Los Angeles, California. The name Esthero refers both to the singer and formerly to the two-person team of herself and producer Doc McKinney. Esthero is a portmanteau of "Esther the hero"; she claims to have gotten the name by combining the name of the heroine (Esther) and last line ("If I am to be the hero, then I cannot fly from darkness") of the film from Sylvia Plath's novel The Bell Jar.

Esthero's sound characteristically features her voice over a mix of mellow bass lines, jazzy trumpets, Spanish guitar and hip-hop. She is sometimes compared to artists Björk, Portishead, Billie Holiday, and Sade. She has co-produced the majority of the material she performed. Later female artists who count Esthero among their influences include Res, Fergie and fellow Canadian Nelly Furtado.

Esthero's brother, Jason Englishman, is also a musician.

Career

Early life
At the age of sixteen, Esthero moved from the small town of Harriston, Ontario on her own to Toronto, Ontario, where she began singing at open-mic nights while supporting herself by working at different jobs. She was seen singing at the Free Times Cafe by manager Beau Ovcaric who set up a showcase for his partner Zack Werner. They introduced her to EMI Publishing Canada president Michael McCarty, whom she charmed so well during their first meeting that without hearing her sing a single note he set up and paid for recording sessions with Martin "Doc" McKinney, a guitarist and studio engineer.

1997: Breath from Another
The young duo quickly began recording together, and six demos in were being courted on the presidency level by almost every major label in the US. Thanks to then EMI publishing US president Rick Krim their demo's reached the ears of the heads of the Work Group (a subsidiary of Sony). Their debut album, Breath from Another, was released to critical acclaim in Spring 1998.

1998–2003: Collaborations and success
Following the dissolution of the WORK label, Esthero was released from her contract. She signed with Reprise in 2000. In 1998, after a remix of one of her songs ("Country Livin'") was used included on the soundtrack for "Slam", Esthero received attention from many hip-hop and rap artists, with many requesting collaborations with her. Some such collaborations were fruitful, such as her work with the Black Eyed Peas on "Weekends", which was an international hit.

In 2001, Esthero collaborated with German producer Ian Pooley on "Balmes (A Better Life)", which reached the Top 75 of the UK Singles chart and gave Esthero her first entry on the US Dance charts.

2004–2005: O.G. Bitch and Wikked Lil Grrrls
On April 20, 2004—without Doc's assistance—Esthero released O.G. Bitch, a standalone EP featuring six alternate remixes of the title track, plus the B-side "I Love You". The song topped the club charts in the US. The following year, she released a second EP, titled We R in Need of a Musical Revolution. The EP spawned a hit of the same name and led the way to Esthero's 2005 full-length album on the Warner Bros. label, Wikked Lil' Grrrls, seven years following her debut album, to mixed critical reaction. The album features contributions from Sean Lennon, André 3000, Jemeni, Jelleestone, and Cee-Lo Green of Goodie Mob.

2007–2011: Split from record company and collaborations
In 2007, Esthero amicably parted ways with Venus Management. She continues to have a familial bond with Zack and Beau. Esthero is currently self managed.

2008 was an eventful year for Esthero, with a number of high-profile collaborations including the viral sensation Yes We Can, a song (with accompanying video) inspired by a speech delivered by Barack Obama and produced by will.i.am. Esthero also provided the voice of the spaceship J.A.N.E. on Kanye West's Glow in the Dark tour and appeared on his album 808s & Heartbreak, on which she co-wrote three tracks under her real name. 2008 also saw her take on the role of producer for a track from Dangerous Muse's debut album and a co-writer on Brandy's album "Human". She is featured on hip hop music producer Timbaland's 2009 album Shock Value II on the songs "Can You Feel It" and "Undertow" with band The Fray. The latter entered the Billboard Hot 100 at number 100, giving Esthero her first and only Hot 100 entry in the US.

2012–present: Everything Is Expensive and "Baby Steps"
On June 5, 2012, Esthero released a new single titled "Never Gonna Let You Go", which was co-written and co-produced with Adam Bravin (She Wants Revenge). The song was featured in the February 21, 2013 episode of the ABC medical drama Grey's Anatomy, titled "This Is Why We Fight". The song reached number 72 on the Canadian Hot 100, giving Esthero her first entry on the chart.

On October 30, 2012, Esthero self-released a new album titled Everything Is Expensive. It debuted at number thirteen on the Billboard Top Heatseekers chart in the US. In Canada, the album was released through Universal Music.

In 2016, "Breath from Another" was nominated for a Polaris Heritage Prize, for best album from 1996 to 2005. The album lost, however, to Arcade Fire's "Funeral" (which won the public vote) and Lhasa de Sela's "La Llorona" (which won the jury vote).

In 2019, Esthero was featured in Black Eyed Peas song "4ever", and was in the accompanying music video which was published on February 1, 2019. Via social media, Esthero announced the song "Baby Steps" on February 3, 2019.

Chart history
Esthero's singles typically perform well in North America. She has had three songs enter the US Dance Club Songs chart ("Balmes", with Ian Pooley; "O.G. Bitch"; and "Fastlane", with Jemeni & Jelleestone); two of the songs reached the top five of the chart and one, "O.G. Bitch", reached number one. She has also had two entries on the US Dance Singles Sales chart ("O.G. Bitch" and "Fastlane"), both of which reached the top ten. She has had one chart entry in the UK ("Balmes", which broke the Top 75), and one chart entry in her native Canada ("Never Gonna Let You Go", which reached number 72 on their Hot 100 chart).

Appearances on television and soundtracks
Esthero has appeared on the Chris Rock Show, Video on Trial, Jimmy Kimmel Live!, as well as Late Night with Conan O'Brien and Farmclub with The Black Eyed Peas. She has also contributed songs to the films I Still Know What You Did Last Summer, Go, Bounce, Zero Effect, I Think I Love My Wife and Down With Love, as well as the video game 007: Nightfire. Collaborations in which she has participated have appeared in Love & Basketball and Slam.

Her song "Wikked Lil' Grrrls" has also appeared in the film Miss Congeniality 2 and in commercial spots for Sex and the City and Desperate Housewives, on the TV show Boston Legal, Smallville, and also on the TV show Las Vegas and its soundtrack, and the film John Tucker Must Die.

Discography 

 Breath from Another (1998; The WORK Group)
 Wikked Lil' Grrrls (2005; Reprise)
 Everything Is Expensive (2012; Universal Music Canada)

See also
 List of number-one dance hits (United States)
 List of artists who reached number one on the US Dance chart

References

External links
 
 Esthero's personal blog
 BackPocketMag.com Artist Profile, Feature on Esthero by Matthew Stroul

1978 births
Living people
Canadian contemporary R&B singers
Canadian dance musicians
Canadian electronic musicians
Canadian expatriate musicians in the United States
Canadian women jazz singers
Canadian women pop singers
Canadian women singer-songwriters
Canadian indie pop musicians
Canadian sopranos
Canadian women in electronic music
Downtempo musicians
Experimental rock musicians
Women rock singers
Feminist musicians
Jewish Canadian musicians
Jewish singers
Canadian LGBT rights activists
Musicians from Ontario
People from Stratford, Ontario
Reprise Records artists
Trip hop musicians
20th-century Canadian women singers
21st-century Canadian women singers
Women in electronic music